Octopus minor, otherwise known as the long arm octopus or the Korean common octopus, is a small-bodied octopus species distributed along the benthic coastal waters surrounding Eastern China, Japan, and the Korean Peninsula. O. minor is commonly found in the mudflats of sub-tidal zones leaving it exposed to significant environmental variations. It is grouped within the class Cephalopoda along with squids and cuttlefish.

O. minor carries cultural and economic value in the Asian countries in which it is found. It is important commercially to the fishing communities in Korea, it contributes to the $35 million octopus industry. It is recognised as a Korean culinary seafood option, commonly referred to as nakji (낙지). The octopus is served both cooked and raw, and is often a snack during sporting events.

There have been multiple findings concerning the physiological makeup of the O. minor. It has been shown to host a dangerous parasite, whilst also demonstrating the ability to adapt its morphology to wide-ranging environmental conditions. These characteristics have increased interest in the species and its genome has been mapped.

Anatomy 
The O. minor, similar to the rest of its order Octopoda, is bilaterally symmetrical along a dorsoventral axis with two eyes and a mouth that centres its eight arms. The arms have evolved from feet as they are flexible and surround its mouth in a webbed formation. These arms contain two-thirds of the octopi's neurons. On the underside of these arms, O. minor has "suckers" which are circular, adhesive suction cups. These are predominantly used for manipulating, navigating, and preparing food. O. minor has a dominant mantle and visceral hump which contains the majority of its fundamental organs. This corresponds with the translation of Cephalopoda which means "head foot", as its foot/feet are directly attached to its head.

O. minor is a small soft-bodied octopus with long arms hence its nickname long-arm octopus. O. minor features eight arms and a bulbous head. It can be identified by its grey colouring which matches the sandy plains in which it is commonly found, however when it finds itself threatened or in danger, it will shift its skin tone to a dark red.

Size 
It is the smaller side of its class compared to colossal squids which can reach over 10 metres (33 feet).

Distribution and behaviour

Feeding 
O. minor, alike other octopus populations, possess predatory traits. O. minor's diet coincides with that of other bottom-dwelling octopuses, with over 50% accounted for by fish, 25% by molluscs such as whelks and clams, the remainder being made up of crustaceans such as crabs, annelids and nematodes, other commonly found species sharing the O. minor habitat. The small nature of the octopus means rejection of larger species including rock scallops and large fish.

The benthic nature of the O. minor allows it to move between rocks and through crevices. Once it has identified its prey, it makes a sudden pounce, using its suckers to grip onto it and pull it in. The O. minor preys on smaller targets by trapping them in the web-like structure of its legs. The O. minor injects its prey with a paralysing saliva, using miniature teeth at the end of its salivary papilla to dismember them. When targeting shelled molluscs, the O. minor creates a toxic saliva that enables the calcium carbonate of the shell to be broken down. Once the outer protection is penetrated, the prey's muscles relax allowing the octopus to remove its soft issues, in-turn, killing it.

Feeding intensities differ between the males and females of the O. minor. Different intensities revolve around the ovarian maturation calendar of the female octopus. From months April to July the intensity of feeding in females decreased, alternatively an increase in males. Whilst 10 different taxa have been identified within the stomach of the O. minor, the Gobiidae family was most prevalent during the female's ovarian maturation.

Locomotion 
Different to other multi-limbed hydrostats such as crabs, the O. minor performs movements using all eight independent limbs. The arrangement of muscles within its arms allows for movement in any direction. Movements of the O. minor involve crawling between rocks and crevices. This combines with swimming with its dorsal fin in a leading position. Jet propulsion is another method of locomotion performed by the O. minor. The process of crawling involves the use the octopus's suckers. Some are used to grip to surrounding environments allowing the octopus to pull itself forward using muscles within its legs. Others push from behind. This process is repeated until a change of locomotion is performed.

The O. minor performs a swimming motion using the expulsion of water from the mantle through its siphon into the ocean behind it. Force provided by the water allows the octopus to move in the opposite direction. The direction of movement is dependent on the way in which the siphon is faced. The long arms found on the O. minor provide it with a streamline swimming shape. Its bilateral symmetry allows it to move headfirst, with its legs trailing. Jet swimming is used predominantly for escape from danger.

The O. minor performs a movement known as “pumping”. This involves the legs of the O. minor contracting in unison, allowing for the production of a wave. This provides a force which moves the body. The O. minor uses its appendages to crawl outside of the water. For the O. minor this is performed between tide pools and when served as a culinary option.

Habitat 
The habitats of the O. minor vary greatly between rocky floors, reefs and the ocean floor. It is a benthic octopus, meaning it lies at the lowest body of water, around the sediment surface and rock or coral cover. The O. minor is located within the mudflats of sub-tidal zones surrounding the south western coast of the Korean peninsula. O. minor residing within the mudflats of coastal regions are exposed to rough salinity, temperature and water movement conditions. The O. minor finds itself in rocky areas such as Jeju Island.

The O. minor is commonly found in the Yellow Sea. This is a segment of the Western Pacific Ocean situated between the Korean Peninsula and mainland China, connected to the Gulf of Bohai. The sea extends over 950 kilometres from North to South and 700 kilometres wide. The sea has a cyclone current and semidiurnal tides with temperatures that range from -10 degrees Celsius to 28 degrees Celsius.

Colour change 
The O. minor, when hunting and avoiding predators, use specialised pigment-filled bags known as chromatophores. These are found in the skin, allowing the octopus to adjust its colour or reflectivity. Colour variation of chromatophores include red, brown, black, grey, yellow or blue. Other colour methods include the use of an iridescent dermal tissue. This manipulated by the O. minor to communicate with other octopus and proceed with courtship rituals.

The O. minor possesses muscles on its mantle which change texture to assist in changing colour. The shallow water habitats which the O. minor inhabits has allowed it to evolve more diverse skin than fellow cephalopods.

Relationship to humans 

O. minor is well represented within the Korean commercial fishery field, presenting a high annual yield of over 350,000 tonnes. This has led to its inclusion within multiple signature seafood dishes, mostly found within Korea. The rapid adaption of the organism to the stressful conditions of its habitat encouraged scientific research and the mapping of its genome.

Culinary use 
Within most parts of Korea, O. minor or Nakji, is a culinary option, being served most commonly as a snack either raw, cooked or poached.

Nakji-bokkeum (cooked) 
For this dish, O. minor is chopped, then stir-fried with vegetables such as carrots, onions and cabbage. It is marinated with a local Korean red pepper sauce, then served hot with warm rice, somyeon, or bean sprouts.

San-nakji (raw) 
For this dish, O. minor is either chopped or whole and served raw on a plate. It is often served with sesame oil and sesame seeds. The significant number of nerve endings in the arms of the O. Minor combined with its sophisticated nervous system, allows for a variety of movements when disconnected from the brain, meaning the octopus performs movements whilst being served. As the suction cups are still active on the cephalopod's arms, they may grip to one's throat, therefore consumers are at risk of choking.

Nakji-yeonpo-tang (soup) 
For this dish, O. minor is boiled in stock, before being chopped into fine pieces then served in the soup with spring onion, chilli and minced garlic. The dish is traditionally offered during funeral processions.

Dangers 
A large percentage (22%) of O. minor have been found to host a dangerous parasitic benthic crustacean. Their increased susceptibility is due to its lack of external shell compared to fellow mollusc, the snail. The presence Octopicola huanghaienis parasite is identified by a spike at the end of its labrum lap. The parasite is a health concern when O. minor is served raw.

Genetic research 
O. minor's adaption of its behavioural repertoire to assorted habitat conditions made it a promising model to be studied and to have its genome mapped. Distributions of the O. minor between the Korean Peninsula and Eastern China identified genetic differences in individuals from different habitats. The borders of these countries are connected by the Yellow Sea. Genetic structures of O. minor were analysed using a sequence of the CO1 gene as it shows higher base-substitution mutation rates.

Genome mapping 
The morphology of the O. minor was analysed for genome mapping. O. minor was studied for its ability to tolerate environmental changes. Its molecular basis was studied for plasticity development and mechanisms underlying adaption. The concluding genome assembly of the octopus was 5.09 Gb, with over 30 010 genes; 44% were made up of repeated elements. The total number of gene families within O. Minor are 178. A highly identical nucleotide sequence across multiple species suggests the O. minor is actually the same species as Callioctopus ornatus and Callioctopus luteus, despite them occupying different habitats.

References 

Molluscs described in 1920
Cephalopods of Asia
Molluscs of the Pacific Ocean
Octopodidae
Korean seafood